The Let LF-109 Pionýr is a glider aircraft developed by Czechoslovak manufacturer Let Kunovice. It was designed as a two-seater training aircraft and the first flight was performed in March 1950. The plane features a simple and robust design of a fabric-covered steel tube fuselage and has good flight characteristics. In total, about 470 aircraft were built.

Specifications

References

External links

Airliners.net Picture of the Let LF-109 Pionýr aircraft

Let aircraft
Glider aircraft
1950s Czechoslovakian sailplanes
Aircraft first flown in 1950